"United Republic" is the national anthem of Yemen. It was written by Abdollah Abdolwahâb Noʿmân and composed by ʾAyub Ṭâreš. The music was formerly used as the national anthem of South Yemen but was adopted by Yemen when the country was unified in 1990.

During its usage by South Yemen from 1979 to 1990, the title was "National Anthem of People's Democratic Republic of Yemen".

Lyrics

Official lyrics (Since 2006)

1990–2006 Version

Notes

References

External links
 Instrumental version of "United Republic" in RealAudio
 Lyrics in Arabic
 Himnuszok - A vocal version of the Anthem, featured in "Himnuszok" website.

Yemeni songs
National symbols of Yemen
Yemen
National anthem compositions in C major